Tsukari Dam is an earthfill dam located in Aomori Prefecture in Japan. The dam is used for irrigation. The catchment area of the dam is 23.3 km2. The dam impounds about 8  ha of land when full and can store 451 thousand cubic meters of water. The construction of the dam was started on 1951 and completed in 1962.

References

Dams in Aomori Prefecture
1962 establishments in Japan